The 2019 Extremaduran regional election was held on Sunday, 26 May 2019, to elect the 10th Assembly of the autonomous community of Extremadura. All 65 seats in the Assembly were up for election. The election was held simultaneously with regional elections in eleven other autonomous communities and local elections all throughout Spain, as well as the 2019 European Parliament election.

Overview

Electoral system
The Assembly of Extremadura was the devolved, unicameral legislature of the autonomous community of Extremadura, having legislative power in regional matters as defined by the Spanish Constitution and the Extremaduran Statute of Autonomy, as well as the ability to vote confidence in or withdraw it from a regional president.

Voting for the Assembly was on the basis of universal suffrage, which comprised all nationals over 18 years of age, registered in Extremadura and in full enjoyment of their political rights. Additionally, Extremadurans abroad were required to apply for voting before being permitted to vote, a system known as "begged" or expat vote. The 65 members of the Assembly of Extremadura were elected using the D'Hondt method and a closed list proportional representation, with a electoral threshold of five percent of valid votes—which included blank ballots—being applied in each constituency. Alternatively, parties failing to reach the threshold in one of the constituencies were also entitled to enter the seat distribution as long as they ran candidates in both districts and reached five percent regionally. Seats were allocated to constituencies, corresponding to the provinces of Badajoz and Cáceres, with each being allocated an initial minimum of 20 seats and the remaining 25 being distributed in proportion to their populations.

Election date
The term of the Assembly of Extremadura expired four years after the date of its previous election, unless it was dissolved earlier. The election decree was required to be issued no later than the twenty-fifth day prior to the date of expiry of parliament and published on the following day in the Official Journal of Extremadura (DOE), with election day taking place on the fifty-fourth day from publication. The previous election was held on 24 May 2015, which meant that the legislature's term would have expired on 24 May 2019. The election decree was required to be published in the DOE no later than 30 April 2019, with the election taking place on the fifty-fourth day from publication, setting the latest possible election date for the Assembly on Sunday, 23 June 2019.

The president had the prerogative to dissolve the Assembly of Extremadura and call a snap election, provided that no motion of no confidence was in process and that dissolution did not occur before one year had elapsed since the previous one. In the event of an investiture process failing to elect a regional president within a two-month period from the first ballot, the Assembly was to be automatically dissolved and a fresh election called.

Parliamentary composition
The Assembly of Extremadura was officially dissolved on 2 April 2019, after the publication of the dissolution decree in the Official Journal of Extremadura. The table below shows the composition of the parliamentary groups in the Assembly at the time of dissolution.

Parties and candidates
The electoral law allowed for parties and federations registered in the interior ministry, coalitions and groupings of electors to present lists of candidates. Parties and federations intending to form a coalition ahead of an election were required to inform the relevant Electoral Commission within ten days of the election call, whereas groupings of electors needed to secure the signature of at least two percent of the electorate in the constituencies for which they sought election, disallowing electors from signing for more than one list of candidates.

Below is a list of the main parties and electoral alliances which contested the election:

Campaign

Election debates

Opinion polls
The table below lists voting intention estimates in reverse chronological order, showing the most recent first and using the dates when the survey fieldwork was done, as opposed to the date of publication. Where the fieldwork dates are unknown, the date of publication is given instead. The highest percentage figure in each polling survey is displayed with its background shaded in the leading party's colour. If a tie ensues, this is applied to the figures with the highest percentages. The "Lead" column on the right shows the percentage-point difference between the parties with the highest percentages in a poll. When available, seat projections determined by the polling organisations are displayed below (or in place of) the percentages in a smaller font; 33 seats were required for an absolute majority in the Assembly of Extremadura.

Results

Overall

Distribution by constituency

Aftermath

Notes

References
Opinion poll sources

Other

2019 in Extremadura
Extremadura
Regional elections in Extremadura
May 2019 events in Spain